Lorena Aida Benítes Valverde (born July 24, 1982 in Esmeraldas) is an Ecuadorian taekwondo practitioner. She represented Ecuador at the  2008 Summer Olympics in Beijing, where she competed and played for the women's heavyweight category (+67 kg), an event which was later dominated by Mexico's María Espinoza. She was eliminated in the first preliminary round of the competition, after being defeated by Australia's Carmen Marton, who only scored two points in the match.

References

External links

NBC 2008 Olympics profile

Ecuadorian female taekwondo practitioners
1982 births
Living people
Taekwondo practitioners at the 2008 Summer Olympics
Olympic taekwondo practitioners of Ecuador
21st-century Ecuadorian women